Blood Frenzy is a 1987 American slasher film directed by Hal Freeman and starring Lisa Loring.

Premise
A psychiatrist takes a group of her patients out into the desert for a therapy session. They are stalked by a killer.

Cast
Wendy MacDonald as Dr. Barbara Shelley
Tony Montero as Rick Carlson
Lisa Loring as Dory
Lisa Savage as Cassie
Hank Garrett as Dave Ash
Monica Silveria as Jean
John Clark as Crawford
Chuck Rhae as Lonnie
J'aime Cohen as Little Dory
Carl Tignino as Dory's father
Eddie Laufer as Little Lonnie

Production
The film was based on a script by Ray Dennis Steckler called Warning - No Trespassing. Ted Newsom was hired to rewrite by Hal Freeman, who had made a lot of money making pornographic films and wanted to expand into other genres. Newsom made the script a cross between Ten Little Indians and Friday the 13th. He says Freeman financed the film entirely himself.

Newsom wrote the film to be shot half on location and half in a studio but it ended up being shot entirely on location over two weeks. The film unit was based out of Barstow in California.

Release and canceled sequel
The film was released on video.

Newsom wrote a follow up for Freeman called Judgment Night about a convicted murderer who escapes prison and seeks revenge. Freeman died before it was made.

References

External links
Blood Frenzy at IMDb

1987 films
1987 horror films
1980s slasher films
American slasher films
American serial killer films
Horror films about clowns
1987 direct-to-video films
1980s English-language films
1980s American films